John Allen is former head football coach for Kean University in Union, New Jersey and Southwestern Assemblies of God University in Waxahachie, Texas. At Kean he compiled an overall record of 8–11–1, while at Southwest Assemblies his record was 2–9–1, giving Allen an overall record of 10–20–2.

Head coaching record

References

Year of birth missing (living people)
Living people
Kean Cougars football coaches
Southwestern Assemblies of God Lions football coaches